Turégano Club de Fútbol is a Spanish football club based in Turégano in the autonomous community of Castile and León. Founded in 1950, it plays in Primera Regional – Group 4, holding home games at Estadio El Burgo, with a capacity of 500 seats.

Season to season

References

External links
Soccerway team profile

1950 establishments in Spain
Association football clubs established in 1950
Football clubs in Castile and León
Sport in Segovia